The 2020–21 F.C. Famalicão season was the club's 89th year in existence and second consecutive season in the top flight of Portuguese football. In addition to the domestic league, Famalicão participated in this season's edition of the Taça de Portugal. The season covers the period from July 2020 to 30 June 2021.

Players

First-team squad

Competitions

Overview

Primeira Liga

League table

Results summary

Results by round

Matches
The league fixtures were announced on 28 August 2020.

Taça de Portugal

Statistics

Goalscorers

Notes

References

F.C. Famalicão seasons
Famalicão